The Platte River is a tributary of the Missouri River, about  long, in southwestern Iowa and northwestern Missouri in the United States.  It is sometimes known as the Little Platte River to distinguish it from the larger Platte River, also a tributary of the Missouri, in nearby Nebraska; the Platte River of Missouri itself has a tributary known as the "Little Platte River".

Course
The Platte River rises near Creston in Union County, Iowa, and flows generally southwardly through Adams, Ringgold and Taylor Counties in Iowa; and Worth, Nodaway, Andrew, Buchanan and Platte Counties in Missouri.  Along its course it passes the Iowa towns of Maloy, Blockton and Athelstan; and the Missouri towns of Sheridan, Parnell, Ravenwood, Conception Junction, Guilford, Tracy, Platte City and Farley.  The Platte flows into the Missouri River near Farley, downstream of Leavenworth, Kansas.

Several sections of the river's course have been straightened and channelized.

Tributaries
Near its headwaters in Iowa the Platte collects minor branches known as the West Platte River, Middle Platte River, and East Platte River.
In Buchanan County, Missouri, it collects the One Hundred and Two River and the Third Fork, which rises in Gentry County and flows southwardly through DeKalb County, past Union Star.  The Third Fork collects the Little Third Fork, which flows southwardly through DeKalb and Buchanan Counties, past Clarksdale. Before leaving Buchanan County Castile Creek enters from the northeast.
In Platte County, Missouri, it collects the Little Platte River, which rises in DeKalb County and flows south-southwestwardly through Clinton and Clay Counties, past Plattsburg and Smithville.  Near Smithville, a U.S. Army Corps of Engineers dam causes the Little Platte River to form Smithville Lake.

History

When Missouri entered the union in 1821, the western border of Missouri from Arkansas to Iowa was based on the confluence of the Kansas River and Missouri River in the West Bottoms in Kansas City. Land in what is now the northwest Missouri was deeded to the Ioway, Sac and Fox tribes.

However, settlers (most notably Joseph Robidoux in St. Joseph, Missouri) began encroaching on the land. Further settlers in northern Missouri were upset about being cut off from the Missouri.

In 1836, William Clark (of Lewis and Clark) persuaded the tribes to sell their lands in northwest Missouri. The deal known as the Platte Purchase was named for the river was ratified in 1837 and the tribes were paid $7,500 for an area about the combined size of Delaware and Rhode Island. The land was then annexed to Missouri.

In 1838 settlers used the river (and the Nodaway River) to reach the heart of the newly available land. The Platte River is not used for transportation in modern times although Missouri River steam boats did call on Tracy, Missouri.

On September 3, 1861, bushwhackers burned a bridge over the river at St. Joseph, Missouri, derailing a Hannibal & St. Joseph Railroad train killing between 17 and 20 and injuring 200 in one of the worst attacks on a passenger train in the Platte Bridge Railroad Tragedy during the American Civil War. Union forces were to burn Platte City, Missouri in 1861 and 1864 as they tried to force the residents to give up Silas M. Gordon, the suspected ringleader of the attack.

The river is the biggest river in the Platte Purchase area and it flows through the Kansas City Metropolitan Area as well as St. Joseph, Missouri metropolitan area. The river is an eighth order river.

Average flow at mile 25.1 is 1,925 cubic feet second (54.5 m3/s). The highest flow was 37,800 ft3/s (1070 m3/s) during the Great Flood of 1993 on July 26, 1993. The lowest flow was 12 ft3/s (0.33 m/s) during a drought in August 1989.

See also
List of Iowa rivers
List of Missouri rivers

References

External links
Missouri Department of Conservation Profile of the River
Smithville Lake website

Rivers of Iowa
Rivers of Missouri
Tributaries of the Missouri River
Rivers of Platte County, Missouri
Rivers of Buchanan County, Missouri
Rivers of Andrew County, Missouri
Rivers of Nodaway County, Missouri
Rivers of Worth County, Missouri
Bodies of water of Taylor County, Iowa
Bodies of water of Ringgold County, Iowa
Bodies of water of Adams County, Iowa
Bodies of water of Union County, Iowa